Kalinchok Bhagwati Temple is a Hindu shrine located in the eastern hilly region of Nepal, Kalinchowk Rural Municipality in Dolkha District. 

It is a part of Gaurishankar Conservation Area from where two rivers Sun Koshi and Tamakoshi rivers are sourced.

Kalinchowk is one of the most visited local destinations in the winter. It is known for the trek to the shrine. It used to be the only way to the temple, but in 2018 a cable car has been added to help with the growing number of visitors.

Tourism 
Kalinchowk is a destination for adventurous sports such as skiing during the winter season after the snowfall. Short hiking of about 1-2 hours from Kuri village to the Kainchowk temples is also common. This place has views of the snowy valley during the winter season and enjoys the snowfall. Some other attractions are;

 Kalinchowk Bhagwati temple
 Cable car
 The landscape of Kuri village.
 Skilling and short hiking.
 View of Mt jugal, Sumeru Parbat Gaurishanker, Mt Ganesh, and Pathivara.
 The national flower of Nepal, Rhododendron.

The area's landscapes, Kalinchowk Bhagwati shrine, Kuri village, and mountain views are attractions of Kalinchowk.

References 

Hindu temples in Bagmati Province
 Durga temples
Buildings and structures in Dolakha District